Ulric Browne is a British actor, known for portraying the background role of Winston in BBC soap opera EastEnders.

Career
Since November 1985, Browne has appeared in BBC soap opera EastEnders, portraying the role of Winston, a man that runs a market stall in Walford. He is the show's longest-serving male extra and the show's second longest-serving extra, behind Jane Slaughter's character Tracey. Browne also played Marcus in One Way Out in 1989, and had the guest role of Benny Hughes in The Bill in 2003. In 2004, he played Tiko in The Quiet Storm.

References

External links
 
 

Black British male actors
English male soap opera actors
Living people
Year of birth missing (living people)